The Buddha's Light International Association – Philippines (Chinese: 國際佛光會菲律賓協會) is the Philippine chapter of Buddha's Light International Association and is composed of the following chapters:

External links
 Buddha's Light International Association, Philippines 國際佛光會菲律賓協會
 International Buddhist Progress Society - Manila, Philippines (Fo Guang Shan Manila) 菲律賓馬尼拉佛光山
 Fo Guang Shan 佛光山
 Buddha's Light International Association World Headquarters 國際佛光會世界總會
 Buddha's Light International Association, Philippines - Cebu Chapter

Buddhism in the Philippines
Fo Guang Shan
Religious organizations based in the Philippines